Salem Hempfest, or Salem Hemp Fest, is a cannabis festival in Salem, Oregon, in the United States. The inaugural event was held in Riverfront Park in 2015.

References

2015 establishments in Oregon
Annual events in Oregon
Cannabis events in the United States
Cannabis in Oregon
Culture of Salem, Oregon
Festivals in Oregon
Festivals established in 2015